Modřany is a suburb of Prague south of the city centre on the banks of the Vltava. It belongs to the municipal district Prague 12. Before being joined with the capital Prague in year 1974, Modřany was de facto a town.

The population of the district is 31 738, as of 2006.

Districts of Prague